Reflections of the I is the first full-length album by Norwegian progressive metal band Winds. It was released on September 7, 2002.

Track listing
0 "Untitled eerie track" – 9:26
1 "Clarity" – 2:15
2 "Realization" – 4:53
3 "Of Divine Nature" – 4:37
4 "Transition" – 1:16
5 "Passion's Quest" – 4:51
6 "Reason's Desire" – 5:11
7 "Premonition" – 1:59
8 "Remnants of Beauty" – 5:37
9 "Existence" – 3:48
10 "Continuance" – 3:26
11 "Predominance" - 0:45

Recording Line-Up
Eikind (Age of Silence, ex-Khold, Tulus) - vocals, bass
Carl August Tidemann - guitars
Andy Winter (Age of Silence) - piano, keyboards
Hellhammer (Age of Silence, Arcturus, ex-The Kovenant, Mayhem) - drums

References

Winds (band) albums
2002 debut albums
Albums with cover art by Travis Smith (artist)